The Swiss Film Archive (French: Cinémathèque suisse, German: Schweizer Filmarchiv) is a Swiss state-approved noncommercial foundation based in Lausanne.

Its aims are to collect, protect, study and present film archives.

Notes and references

See also 
 Federal Archives of Switzerland
 Swiss Posters Collection
 Cinema of Switzerland
 List of Swiss films
 Association des Cinémathèques Européennes (ACE)
 List of film archives

External links 

 

Film organisations in Switzerland
Film archives in Europe
Archives in Switzerland